Lomatia tinctoria, commonly known as guitar plant, is a shrub to about 2 metres tall of the family Proteaceae. It is one of three species of Lomatia endemic to Tasmania, the others being L. polymorpha and L. tasmanica. Lomatia tinctoria is closely related to L. polymorpha, with which it sometimes hybridises.  Its leaves are divided, while those of L. polymorpha are simple.

Description
Lomatia tinctoria grows as a woody shrub reaching 1.5 m (5 ft) high, or rarely up to 2 m (7 ft) high. The leaves are strongly lobed (pinnate or bipinnate) and are around 8 cm long. The white or cream flower heads, known as inflorescences, appear in summer.

The common name of guitar plant may refer to the shape of the fruit.

Taxonomy and naming
French naturalist Jacques Labillardière first described this species as Embothrium tinctorium in 1805, with the species name, Latin tinctoria "used in dyeing", relating to a product in the fruit that can be used for dyeing. At the time, Embothrium was a wastebasket taxon to which many proteaceae were assigned. It was given its current binomial name by Robert Brown in his 1810 On the natural order of plants called Proteaceae. An alternative name, Tricondylus silaifolius, published by Joseph Knight in his 1809 On the cultivation of the plants belonging to the natural order of Proteeae, was rejected, after Brown's 1810 description of the genus Lomatia was officially conserved against Salisbury's 1809 Tricondylus.

Distribution and habitat
Lomatia tinctoria is found in north eastern Tasmania, "mostly north and east of the Pieman and Derwent rivers and on Cape Barren and on and Flinders Islands".  Lomatia polymorpha occurs "approximately south of the Pieman River and west of the Derwent River" but where the ranges overlap, as for example near Lake St Clair, apparent hybrids occur, even though the leaves of the two species are "strikingly different".

Use in horticulture
Lomatia tinctoria can be grown in gardens, doing best on acidic well-drained soils, and tolerating sunny or shady locations. It is readily propagated from seed or cuttings.

References

External sources 
 http://apps.kew.org/herbcat/getImage.do?imageBarcode=K000324612
  available as eBook
 
 
 Australian Native Plants Society (Australia) http://anpsa.org.au/l-tin.html

tinctoria
Flora of Tasmania
Proteales of Australia
Plants described in 1810
Taxa named by Jacques Labillardière
Taxa named by Robert Brown (botanist, born 1773)